Conglomerate or conglomeration may refer to:

 Conglomerate (company)
 Conglomerate (geology)
 Conglomerate (mathematics)

In popular culture:
 The Conglomerate (American group), a production crew and musical group founded by Busta Rhymes
 Conglomerate (record label), a hip hop label founded by Busta Rhymes
 The Conglomerate (Australian group), a jazz quartet

See also 
 Conglomerate Ridge, in the Ellsworth Mountains, Antarctica
 ConGlomeration (convention)